Jacques Rivette (1928–2016) was a French filmmaker and film critic.

Rivette may also refer to:

 Rivette (horse), a racehorse
 Andrea Rivette, American actress

See also
 Rivet (disambiguation)
 Rivett (disambiguation)